The World Group was the highest level of Davis Cup competition in 2007. The first-round losers went into the Davis Cup World Group Play-offs, and the winners progress to the quarterfinals. The quarterfinalists were guaranteed a World Group spot for 2008.

Participating Teams

Draw

First round

Chile vs. Russia

France vs. Romania

Germany vs. Croatia

Belgium vs. Australia

Czech Republic vs. United States

Switzerland vs. Spain

Belarus vs. Sweden

Austria vs. Argentina

Quarterfinals

Russia vs. France

Belgium vs. Germany

United States vs. Spain

Sweden vs. Argentina

Semifinals

Russia vs. Germany

Sweden vs. United States

Final

United States vs. Russia

References

World Group
Davis Cup World Group